Zaynê Akyol (born in 1987 in Turkey) is a female Canadian filmmaker, producer and photographer. She predominantly focuses on documentary film and is known for her feature-length documentary film Gulîstan, Land of Roses  (2016), which was supported by the National Film Board (NFB) and MitosFilm in Germany.

Early life and education 
Zaynê Akyol was born in a village in Turkey during 1987 to Kurdish parents. The Kurdish army would frequently visit her village and Akyol has described the Kurdistan Workers' Party (PKK) as being "part of my environment from a very early age". When she was four years old Akyol and her family moved to Canada, where they lived in Montreal, Quebec.

She went on to attend Cégep Montmorency in Montreal for her pre-university education, after which she attended the University of Montreal for her bachelor's degree. Akyol found the program at the University of Montreal too theoretical for her, so she chose to transfer to the L'Université du Québec à Montréal. Her first application to the university was declined, so Akyol tried again the following year and was successful.

Akyol graduated from the L'Université du Québec à Montréal in 2010 with a Bachelor of Communication. She chose to stay with the university to pursue her master's degree and in 2014 Akyol graduated with a master's degree in Communication with a concentration in film.

Career 
Akyol produced her short film Under Two Skies as part of her baccalaureate during the senior year of her bachelor's degree. The film was presented at the Abu Dhabi Film Festival October, 2010 at United Arab Emirates. It also screened in May on the screens of the Cannes Film Festival as part of Short Film Corner, the short film division. The 31-minutes documentary went on to win the Documentary-Young Creators Programming Audience Award.

Akyol began filming Gulîstan, Land of Roses in July 2014 and completed filming in September of the same year. This film, along with 17 other English and French language documentary films, gained support from Telefilm and the Rogers Group of Funds, who invested 2.5 million Canadian dollars in the movies. The plot of Gulîstan, Land of Roses centers around her journey to find the titular Gulîstan, a Kurdish woman born in the same village as Akyol and her childhood guardian. To shoot the film Akyol went deep into the hills of Kurdistan Region of Iraq, during which time she stayed close and live with a group of female soldiers.

After the film's release, Zaynê Akyol held a photo exhibition entitled “Rojekê, One Day”. All of the photographs were shot during the shooting of the film Gulîstan, Land of Roses and the exhibition, which was held for three months, took place at Espace Mile End. The venue had some difficulty displaying the images, as it could only display seven of the twenty photos meant to be part of the exhibit.

Filmography

Awards and nominations 

 Special Jury Prize, Hot Docs Canadian International Documentary Festival (Hot Docs), Toronto (Canada), May 2022
ROJEK (2022)

References

External links
 

Canadian women film producers
Canadian people of Kurdish descent
Canadian documentary film producers
Canadian women film directors
Canadian documentary film directors
Turkish emigrants to Canada
Living people
1987 births
Canadian women documentary filmmakers